Butler Township is a township in Schuylkill County, Pennsylvania, United States.  Formed in 1848 from part of Barry Township, it is named for war hero William Orlando Butler.

Geography

Demographics

As of the census of 2000, there were 3,588 people, 1,416 households, and 1,035 families living in the township.  The population density was 137.4 people per square mile (53.1/km2).  There were 1,540 housing units at an average density of 59.0/sq mi (22.8/km2).  The racial makeup of the township was 98.91% White, 0.59% African American, 0.03% Native American, 0.22% Asian, 0.11% from other races, and 0.14% from two or more races. Hispanic or Latino of any race were 0.11% of the population.

There were 1,416 households, out of which 25.1% had children under the age of 18 living with them, 60.8% were married couples living together, 7.7% had a female householder with no husband present, and 26.9% were non-families. 23.9% of all households were made up of individuals, and 13.1% had someone living alone who was 65 years of age or older.  The average household size was 2.44 and the average family size was 2.88.

In the township the population was spread out, with 18.7% under the age of 18, 6.9% from 18 to 24, 26.0% from 25 to 44, 28.5% from 45 to 64, and 19.9% who were 65 years of age or older.  The median age was 44 years. For every 100 females, there were 96.3 males.  For every 100 females age 18 and over, there were 93.8 males.

The median income for a household in the township was $39,375, and the median income for a family was $48,886. Males had a median income of $34,259 versus $21,806 for females. The per capita income for the township was $19,723.  About 2.6% of families and 5.2% of the population were below the poverty line, including 5.5% of those under age 18 and 4.6% of those age 65 or over.

Gallery

References

Townships in Schuylkill County, Pennsylvania
Townships in Pennsylvania